The Ogdensburg–Prescott Border Crossing connects the cities of Ogdensburg, New York and Johnstown, Ontario on the Canada–United States border, and is located at the Ogdensburg–Prescott International Bridge.  Even though it is located 3 miles (5 km) northeast of the cities, the bridge and the border crossing are named for Ogdensburg and Prescott because they were intended to replace ferry service between the two cities when the bridge was built in 1960.  Prior to 1960, vessels crossed between Ogdensburg and Prescott (and border inspections were conducted) since 1800.

The US border inspection station shown in the photo was built in 1960. The inspection canopy was replaced, and the building significantly upgraded and expanded in 2004.  The Canada border station was replaced in 2012.

See also
 List of Canada–United States border crossings

References 

Canada–United States border crossings
1960 establishments in New York (state)
1960 establishments in Ontario
Transportation in St. Lawrence County, New York
Buildings and structures in St. Lawrence County, New York
Leeds and Grenville United Counties